Cecilia González Gómez (28 May 1961 – 3 January 2017) was a Mexican politician affiliated with the PRI. She  served as a Deputy in the LXII Legislature of the Mexican Congress representing Jalisco.

Gómez suffered a fatal heart attack on 3 January 2017, aged 55.

References

1961 births
2017 deaths
Politicians from Jalisco
Women members of the Chamber of Deputies (Mexico)
Institutional Revolutionary Party politicians
21st-century Mexican politicians
21st-century Mexican women politicians
Members of the Chamber of Deputies (Mexico) for Jalisco